Payday: The Heist is a cooperative first-person shooter developed by Overkill Software and published by Sony Online Entertainment. It was released on 18 October 2011, for PlayStation 3 in North America and 2 November in Europe. It was released on 20 October for Windows via Steam. The game runs on the Diesel game engine. It contains seven different missions (including the free No Mercy downloadable content (DLC) released on 25 July 2012), with each mission containing random elements which alter the gameplay in subtle ways with the aim of enhancing replayability. The Wolf Pack DLC was released on PlayStation 3 and PC in August 2012. This DLC added two heists, additional weapons, increased level cap, and a player upgrade tree.

Gameplay 
In Payday: The Heist, players use a variety of firearms to complete objectives (usually centered around stealing a certain object, person, or a particular amount of money). The game plays from the first person perspective, but offers a few twists on the standard FPS formula. Killing civilians is punished, instead players may take a limited number as hostages. Should any player get arrested (after taking enough damage and not being "revived" in time) during the heist, one of their teammates may release a hostage, allowing a trade to take place which allows a single player to be released. While playing the levels, players will notice a lot of variation in a single level, as there are often a large number of random events programmed in. An example of this is the location of the bank manager in First World Bank.

The game focuses on four robbers (Dallas, Hoxton, Chains, and Wolf) who team up. Their first heist took place at the First World Bank, where they entered a vault by using thermite hidden on the inside of a photocopier and stole a large amount of money. A post-game message congratulates the group, telling them that they are "set for life", but recommends more heists, including robbing drug junkies in an abandoned apartment complex and ambushing a prisoner transport in heavy rain weather, simply for the enjoyment of the players.

Downloadable content 
Overkill Software released a few DLC packs; the first one is Wolf Pack, which includes a Nixon mask, new equipment, skills, characters, and heists. It was released in 2012 on 1 August on the European PlayStation Store and on 7 August for the North American PlayStation Store and PC. The new content included a new Technician skill tree that gave the players access to the AK, the GL40 and the Stryk pistol as well as adding in a sentry gun. Also included were two new heists, Counterfeit and Undercover. On 25 July, the No Mercy Hospital DLC was released, establishing a link between Left 4 Dead and Payday (although this has been stated to be non-canon). This DLC included the No Mercy heist as well as the Infected mask set for players with Left 4 Dead installed on their computers.
Payday: The Heist was free on Steam for 24 hours in October 2014.

Reception 
Payday: The Heist received "mixed or average" reviews for PlayStation 3 and "generally favorable" reviews for Microsoft Windows, according to review aggregator Metacritic.

Sales 
As of October 2012, Payday: The Heist sold over 700,000 copies. Also, as of November 2014, Payday: The Heist and Payday 2 together have sold more than 9 million units.

Sequels

Payday 2

A sequel entitled Payday 2 was released on 13 August 2013, via Steam for PC, and from 13–16 August for PlayStation 3 and Xbox 360. In the following years, the Payday: The Heist maps have been added to Payday 2.

Payday 3

After games company Starbreeze Studios acquired Overkill Software, Payday 3 was planned. Following Starbreeze's restructuring plan due to financial difficulties in 2018, Starbreeze has stated that they plan to release Payday 3 by 2023.

References

External links 

 

2011 video games
Bank robbery in fiction
Cooperative video games
First-person shooters
Lua (programming language)-scripted video games
Multiplayer and single-player video games
Organized crime video games
PlayStation 3 games
PlayStation Network games
Video games developed in Sweden
Video games scored by Simon Viklund
Video games set in the United States
Windows games